Amorphoscelis tuberculata is a species of praying mantis native to Namibia, Mozambique, South Africa (Transvaal), and Zimbabwe.

See also
List of mantis genera and species

References

Amorphoscelis
Mantodea of Africa
Insects described in 1963